Storage Wars: Miami (stylized as STORAGE WAR$: Miami) is an American reality television series on the A&E Network that premiered on October 6, 2015. When rent is not paid on a storage locker for three months in Florida, the contents can be sold by an auctioneer as a single lot of items in the form of a cash-only auction. The show follows professional buyers who purchase the contents based only on a five-minute inspection of what they can see from the door when it is opened. The goal is to turn a profit on the merchandise.

Cast
Jorge Gomez & wife Maydel Garcia, owner of Guaranteed Fence Corporation.
Yorgen Ugalde & his cousin Christian Fernandez: In the past few years, their weekly garage sale has turned into two stores named 7 Days Garage Sale and The Buying House, a flea market, 24/7 online sales, and a warehouse for their furniture sales.

Episodes
The episodes listed are in broadcast order, not production order.

Broadcast
Internationally, the series premiered in Australia on 9 November 2015 on A&E.

References

External links

Storage Wars (franchise)
2015 American television series debuts
A&E (TV network) original programming
2015 American television series endings